Idaho is the third single to be released from the album Generation Freakshow by the British rock band Feeder. It was released on vinyl the week commencing 27 August 2012, although the digital format was already released the day prior.

As the single was only released on a 7" vinyl and digital download, while not attracting mainstream airplay like many of Feeder's recent singles, "Idaho" did not chart within the top 200.

This became Feeder's last ever single to date to be released on a physical format commercially.

Music video
The video features Grant Nicholas and Taka Hirose in a bar, while the main character, played by Daniel Mays and dressed as the Lone Ranger, attempts a mechanical bull ride to win a trip to Idaho. This has often been seen as Feeder's "most laziest video" by many fans, as Nicholas and Hirose are only seen sitting down talking to people they do not seem to know while drinking alcohol.

The video was shot on July 27, 2012. The night before the band had played a gig on Lusty Glaze Beach, Cornwall, finishing late on into the night, which has been pointed out as evident for the band looking tired in the video.

Flash game
An online flash game entitled "Beat the Bull" based on the video was released on Feeder's website and Facebook page to promote the song, in which the player must keep the character on the mechanical bull for a set period of time. Three songs could be won upon completing various milestones; Headstrong, from the Generation Freakshow album; Along the Avenues, a b-side to the single Borders; and an instrumental version of Idaho.

Track listing

7" vinyl
 "Idaho" - 3:29
 "Stay If You Want To" - 2:44

Digital download
 "Idaho" - 3:29
 "Stay If You Want To" - 2:44

Bonus downloads
 "Headstrong" - 3:13
 "Along the Avenues" - 2:36
 "Idaho (Instrumental)" - 3:30

References

Feeder songs
2012 songs
Song recordings produced by Chris Sheldon
Songs written by Grant Nicholas